This is a discography for rapper MC Eiht from Compton's Most Wanted.

Albums

Studio albums

Collaborative albums

Mixtapes

Extended plays

Charting singles

Guest appearances

Music videos

References

Hip hop discographies
Discographies of American artists